The Yalesville Underpass is a 30-degree skew arch bridge carrying the railroad over Route 150 and Route 71 in Wallingford, Connecticut.  Built in 1838 for the Hartford and New Haven Railroad by William MacKenzie, it is reported to be the first skew underpass in America. The arch was designed to allowed tall hay wagons to pass through but it is not wide enough for modern two-way traffic, the one-way traffic being controlled by a pair of lights.  Due to the age of the bridge, it has to undergo repairs on a regular basis.

In 2018, work was done to accommodate for an additional train track.

References

Buildings and structures in Wallingford, Connecticut
Tourist attractions in New Haven County, Connecticut
Bridges in New Haven County, Connecticut
Arch bridges in the United States
Bridges completed in 1838
1838 establishments in Connecticut